Seamus McCarthy has been Ireland's Comptroller and Auditor General since 28 May 2012.  He is the constitutional officer responsible for public audit in Ireland and heads the Office of the Comptroller and Auditor General. His constitutional status under Article 33 of the Constitution of Ireland ensures his absolute independence.

Besides being Comptroller and Auditor General, he is also ex-officio member of the Standards in Public Office Commission and of the Referendum Commission. 

Prior to his appointment as Comptroller and Auditor General he worked in the Office of the Comptroller and Auditor General from 1994, being appointed Director of Audit in 2008.  From 1991 to 1994, he worked in the Department of Finance.

He was educated at University College Galway and Trinity College Dublin.

Notes and references

External links

 www.intosai.org

Year of birth missing (living people)
Living people
Alumni of the University of Galway
Alumni of Trinity College Dublin
Government audit
Politics of the Republic of Ireland